Pont-Hébert is a commune in the Manche department in Normandy in north-western France. On 1 January 2018, the former commune of Le Hommet-d'Arthenay was merged into Pont-Hébert.

Geography

Climate
Pont-Hébert has a oceanic climate (Köppen climate classification Cfb).

See also
Communes of the Manche department

References

Ponthebert